Bradley and Moxley railway station was a station on the Great Western Railway's London Paddington to Birkenhead via Birmingham Snow Hill line. It was opened in 1862 and served the village of Bradley in Wolverhampton and Moxley area of Darlaston in the West Midlands, England. It closed on 1 May 1915, with the coming of the First World War. Due to poor patronage, it didn't reopen following the end of hostilities. A Midland Metro station was opened at Bradley Lane nearby in 1999.

References

External links
Rail Around Birmingham and the West Midlands: Bradley railway station

Disused railway stations in Wolverhampton
Former Great Western Railway stations
Railway stations in Great Britain opened in 1862
Railway stations in Great Britain closed in 1915
1862 establishments in England
1915 disestablishments in England